Maharaja Manindra Chandra College is an undergraduate college in North Kolkata, India, established in 1941, at 20 Ramkanta Bose Street, Kolkata - 700003. It is affiliated under the University of Calcutta.
It shares premises with Maharaja Sris Chandra College (evening college) and Maharani Kasiswari College (morning college). The college has a second campus in a new building at 12 Padmanath Lane, Kolkata - 700004, donated by Smt. Bandita Mukherjee, daughter of ex-principal of the college Sri Biswanath Mukherjee.

History
The college was established on 15 July 1941 by a renowned education pioneer Dr. Panchanan Neogi, I.E.S. (retd.) and mostly due to the benevolence of Maharaja Sris Chandra Nandi, who proposed the governing body of the college. As a result, it was named as Maharaja Manindra Chandra College, in the memory of his illustrious father, Maharaja Manindra Chandra Nandy of Cossimbazar.

Accreditation
Maharaja Manindra Chandra College is recognized by the University Grants Commission (UGC). In 2012, it was re-accredited and awarded B grade by the National Assessment and Accreditation Council (NAAC).

See also 
List of colleges affiliated to the University of Calcutta
Education in India
Education in West Bengal

References

External links
Maharaja Manindra Chandra College

Educational institutions established in 1941
University of Calcutta affiliates
Universities and colleges in Kolkata
1941 establishments in India